Used Car Export Constructing & Research Association of R.O.C. is a nonprofit organization in the auto industry. It established Taiwan's used car export policies and industrial development, and seeks to promote innovations in the automotive export industry. It was founded on December 8, 2014, and is the only used car export association in Taiwan.

History 
On December 18, 2015, the Legislative Yuan officially passed the third reading of the commodity tax act, article 12, section 5. The Ministry of Finance emphasized that the vehicle-retirement program encouraged people to buy new cars and replace their old ones. They believed that this would promote the development of the growing automotive industry, while also reducing energy consumption and decreasing carbon emissions. On January 6, 2016, the Presidential office announced that commodity tax article 12-5 was in force. In October 2016, the Industrial Development Bureau, Ministry of Economic Affairs processed an appraisal report of expenditures on taxes regarding the replacement of old automobiles with new and exporting used cars. They referenced UCECRA's information in providing a model for used car export to various countries such as Singapore, Japan, South Korea, etc.

Milestones 
 December 8, 2014: The association was established with the purpose of promoting the development of Taiwan's (R.O.C.) emerging used car export industry.
 December 18, 2015: The Legislative Yuan officially passed the third reading of commodity tax, article 12 section 5.
 January 6, 2016: The Presidential office announced that commodity tax article 12-5 was officially implemented.
 May 16, 2016: The association cohosted “Taiwan's used car export Forum”.
 October 2016: The Industrial Development Bureau and the Ministry of Economic Affairs referenced the association's information in providing a model for used car export.
 September 17, 2018: Bureau of Foreign Trade, Ministry of Economic Affairs referred to the association to provide information on exporting large trucks.

References 

2014 establishments in Taiwan
Motor trade associations